The Moscow Carnegie Library is a historic building in Moscow, Idaho. It was built as a Carnegie library in 1905, and the front steps were built in the 1930s. It was designed by architect Watson Vernon in the Spanish Colonial Revival style. It has been listed on the National Register of Historic Places since June 18, 1979.

References

Libraries on the National Register of Historic Places in Idaho
National Register of Historic Places in Latah County, Idaho
Mission Revival architecture in Idaho
Library buildings completed in 1905
Carnegie libraries in Idaho
1905 establishments in Idaho